Communauté d'agglomération Riom Limagne et Volcans is the communauté d'agglomération, an intercommunal structure, centred on the town of Riom. It is located in the Puy-de-Dôme department, in the Auvergne-Rhône-Alpes region, central France. Created in 2017, its seat is in Riom. Its area is 401.8 km2. Its population was 67,503 in 2019, of which 19,004 in Riom proper.

Composition
The communauté d'agglomération consists of the following 31 communes:

Chambaron-sur-Morge
Chanat-la-Mouteyre
Chappes
Charbonnières-les-Varennes
Châtel-Guyon
Chavaroux
Le Cheix
Clerlande
Ennezat
Entraigues
Enval
Lussat
Malauzat
Malintrat
Marsat
Les Martres-d'Artière
Martres-sur-Morge
Ménétrol
Mozac
Pessat-Villeneuve
Pulvérières
Riom
Saint-Beauzire
Saint-Bonnet-près-Riom
Saint-Ignat
Saint-Laure
Saint-Ours
Sayat
Surat
Varennes-sur-Morge
Volvic

References

Riom Limagne et Volcans
Riom Limagne et Volcans